George Washington Gale (1789 – September 13, 1861) was a Presbyterian minister who founded the Oneida Institute of Science and Industry.

Early life
Gale was born in Stanford, Dutchess County, New York, the youngest of nine siblings, and became a Presbyterian minister in Western New York State. At the time, the transportation center of Utica was the intellectual capital of western New York. 

A graduate with honors from Union College in 1814, he attended Princeton Theological Seminary, but he withdrew because of poor health (dyspepsia). Although he briefly served at the Female Missionary Society, he received his ordination in the St. Laurence Presbytery. He settled down to preach in the Burned-over district. He was not a gifted speaker. Gale's first assignment was as missionary to settlements on the shore of Lake Ontario, followed by a pastorate in Adams, New York.

Oneida Institute of Science and Industry
In 1824, Gale, again troubled by dyspepsia, traveled to the southern United States, visiting Georgetown College, Hampden-Sydney College, and Central College, which was later renamed the University of Virginia. He disapproved of Thomas Jefferson's decision to remove religion from the university's operation.

Gale bought a farm in Western, New York, and started an experiment "teaching some young men who proposed to prepare themselves to preach the Gospel", the seven young men paying him through their labor. This successful experiment would be the start in the United States of the manual labor college. Among the students there was Charles Finney, a lawyer who, through Gale's efforts, found a new faith in Christ and undertook to become a Christian minister.

In 1827, Gale founded the Oneida Institute of Science and Industry in Whitesboro, New York, an institution with a strong religious component, incorporating manual labor as a means by which students could pay for their education and simultaneously receive the spiritual (psychological) and physical benefits of exercise. Most of the Western students followed him there.

Although the details are not known,) Gale was not effective as the Institute's leader; he described his own status as "straitened". He was "too indifferent to money to handle it carefully or account for it consistently." He asked to be replaced in 1831, and his replacement, Beriah Green, "for whom Gale had nothing but scorn", took over in 1833, finding that Gale had left the school with significant indebtedness. The philanthropist brothers and benefactors of Oneida Lewis and Arthur Tappan sought a new manual labor school to support, hiring in 1832 one of Gale's students, Theodore Weld, to find a suitable location. Weld recommended the new Lane Theological Seminary, in Cincinnati. In a highly public incident Gale never refers to, a group of about 24 students, led by Weld, moved there from Oneida, complaining mysteriously about "the lack of theological classes". Finding Lane unhospitable to their abolitionism, they left en masse for the new Oberlin. Both Lane and Oberlin were barely functioning before the arrival of the Oneida contingent.

Knox College
From 1833 to 1834, while in Whitesboro, the unemployed Gale drew up the plans and recruited supporters for yet another manual labor college, further west. A scouting party (a "committee") found fertile, well-situated land available in Illinois. In 1836, more than 30 families, most from the Utica–Troy Mohawk River region of upstate New York, accompanied him to found Galesburg, Illinois, named for him, and in 1837 the Knox Manual Labor College (later Knox College, site of one of the famous Lincoln-Douglas debates of 1858). Gale became a professor of rhetoric and moral philosophy at Knox.

Gale died on September 13, 1861.

References

Further reading 

American city founders
Princeton Theological Seminary alumni
1789 births
1861 deaths
Union College (New York) alumni
People from Stanford, New York
Knox College (Illinois)
Oneida Institute
People from Whitesboro, New York
People from Galesburg, Illinois
American Presbyterian ministers
American manual labor schools